Kenneth Edwin Paver (4 October 1903 – 20 November 1975) was an English first-class cricketer.

Paver represented Hampshire in two first-class matches, making his debut against Northamptonshire in the 1925 County Championship. Paver's second and final appearance for the county came in the 1926 County Championship against Somerset.

Paver died at Ringwood, Hampshire on 20 November 1975.

External links
Kenneth Paver at Cricinfo
Kenneth Paver at CricketArchive

1903 births
1975 deaths
Sportspeople from Dover, Kent
English cricketers
Hampshire cricketers